"A Jukebox With a Country Song'" is a song written by Gene Nelson and Ronnie Samoset, and recorded by American country music artist Doug Stone. It was released in November 1991 as the second single from his album I Thought It Was You. It became his second song to reach #1 on the country chart in both the United States and Canada. The B-side, "Remember the Ride", was later recorded by Perfect Stranger on their 1995 album You Have the Right to Remain Silent.

Content
In this song, after having an argument with his wife, the narrator goes to have a drink at his old haunt only to find that it has been turned into a high-class fern bar. In utter disbelief for the rest of the song, he is eventually dragged out of the bar, asking what happened to it.

Music video
The music video was directed by Peter Lippman.

Chart performance

Year-end charts

References

Songs about jukeboxes
Songs about country music
1991 singles
Doug Stone songs
Epic Records singles
Song recordings produced by Doug Johnson (record producer)
Songs written by Ronnie Samoset
1991 songs
Songs written by Gene Nelson (songwriter)